Briana Mastel (born November 8, 1994) is an American ice hockey player who currently plays for the Boston Pride in the National Women's Hockey League.

Career 
Mastel played for the Harvard Crimson team from 2013 to 2017, serving as team captain in her final season. As a senior she tied with her Harvard Crimson and future Boston Pride teammate Lexie Laing for the team lead in assists with 13. Across 128 NCAA games, she would score 40 points in four years.

Briana Mastel signed one-year deals with the Boston Pride on July 22, 2019 and October 1, 2020. She played in all 25 regular and post season games for the team. Mastel's playing style has been described as both mobile and a defensive defender.

Personal life 
Mastel has a degree in Psychology from Harvard University, with a minor in Spanish.
She works as an assistant coach of the East Coast Wizards junior girls team.  Mastel also took part in the Boston Bruins Coaching academy as one of eight guest speakers at the 2019 event.  She represented the Positive Coaching Alliance at the event that allowed coaches to receive certifications for the USA Hockey coaching education program.  Mastel is part of the Take the Lead organization that brings together Boston professional sports teams to tackle racism, inequality and discrimination.  She participated in a Take the Lead PSA video to encourage diversity and inclusion.

Career statistics 

Source

Honours 
2016-17 All Ivy League selection
2016-17 Dooley Award winner for sportsmanship, enthusiasm, devotion to her team and to hockey
2014-17 Named to ECAC Hockey All-Academic team three years in a row
2013-14 Named to ECAC All-Rookie Team
2012 US National Women's Under 18 Team silver medalist

References

External links
 
 

1994 births
Living people
American women's ice hockey defensemen
Boston Pride players
Harvard Crimson women's ice hockey players
Ice hockey players from Connecticut
Premier Hockey Federation players
People from Wallingford, Connecticut